Leptomantella is a genus of praying mantids and typical of the new (2019) family Leptomantellidae.  Species have been recorded from Asia.

Previously placed here as a subgenus, the genus Aetaella was erected by Hebard in 1920 and has now been restored.

Species
The Mantodea Species File lists:
 Leptomantella albella (Burmeister, 1838) - type species (as Mantis albella Burmeister)
 Leptomantella ceylonica Beier, 1956
 Leptomantella fragilis Westwood, 1889
 Leptomantella indica Giglio-Tos, 1915
 Leptomantella lactea Saussure, 1870
 Leptomantella montana Beier, 1942
 Leptomantella nigrocoxata Mukherjee, 1995
 Leptomantella parva Uvarov, 1933
 Leptomantella tonkinae Hebard, 1920
 Leptomantella xizangensis Wang, 1993

References

External links
 Image at Flickr: Leptomantella sp. Singapore
 
 

Mantodea genera